The Big East Conference Men's Basketball Defensive Player of the Year award is given to the men's basketball player in the Big East Conference voted as the top defender by the conference coaches. It was first awarded at the end of the 1981–82 season.

Key

Winners

Winners by school

Notes

References

External links 
Big East Conference Defensive Player of the Year Winners at Sports-Reference.com

Defensive Player of the Year
Awards established in 1982